The Bulgaria national handball team is the national team of Bulgaria. It takes part in international handball competitions.

The team participated at the 1974 and 1978 World Men's Handball Championships.

World Championships record

IHF Emerging Nations Championship
2015 – 11th place
2017 – 5th place
2019 – 3rd place
2023 – Qualified

References

External links

IHF profile

Handball
Men's national handball teams
Handball in Bulgaria